Verny is a rural locality (a village) in Kaltymanovsky Selsoviet, Iglinsky District, Bashkortostan, Russia. The population was 91 as of 2010. There are 23 streets.

Geography 
Verny is located 18 km southwest of Iglino (the district's administrative centre) by road. Shaksha is the nearest rural locality.

References 

Rural localities in Iglinsky District